Generic Image Library (GIL), is an open source generic programming library created by Adobe Systems for image-related programming. It was accepted to the Boost C++ Libraries in November 2006 and is included in Boost's latest official release.

References

External links 
 Official site
 Boost C++ Libraries
 Adobe Source Library

Generic programming
Free computer libraries
Free software programmed in C++